The 2009 season is the Puerto Rico Islanders 6th season in the USL First Division. This article shows player statistics and all matches (official and friendly) that the club have and will play during the 2009 season. It also includes matched played in 2009 for the CONCACAF Champions League 2008–09 and CONCACAF Champions League 2009–10.

Club

Management

Kit

Squad

First Team
As of July 4, 2009

2009 Transfers

In

Out

Competitions

Overall

USL 1

Results summary

Results by Match Day (Regular season)

* Positions are tabulated at the end of each week.

CONCACAF Champions League 2008–2009

Championship Round (Bracket)

Matches

Friendlies

* A round of penalty kicks was played after the match, this was already agreed upon by both sides regardless of the match's outcome, Austin won this 3-0.

USL-1 regular season
All kickoff times are in EST. Names in brackets are players who were awarded the assist for the goal.

CONCACAF Champions League 2008-09

CFU Club Championship 2009

CONCACAF Champions League 2009-2010

Squad Statistics 
Competitive matches only. Numbers in brackets indicate appearances as a substitute under the Appearance column and number of assists under the Goal column.
Updated to games played June 20, 2009.

Players

Goalkeepers

Disciplinary record 
Only players with at least one card included.

Updated to games played May 15, 2009.

References

2009
Puerto Rico Islanders
Puerto Rico Islanders
Islanders